The Caproni Ca.91 was a proposed Italian flying boat designed by Caproni.

Design and development
Like the Caproni Ca.90, the Ca.91 had three tandem pairs of  Isotta Fraschini Asso 1000 W-18 inline piston engines, but all three pairs were mounted on the lower wing.

Specifications

References

Ca.091
Biplanes with negative stagger
Six-engined push-pull aircraft